Panin Mensa Boakye (born 2 March 1995) is a Ghanaian footballer.

Club career
He made his professional debut in the Segunda Liga for Marítimo B on 31 August 2014 in a game against Olhanense.

On 19 July 2019, Boakye signed for USL Championship side Tulsa Roughnecks.

References

1995 births
Footballers from Accra
Living people
Ghanaian footballers
Ghanaian expatriate footballers
Expatriate footballers in Portugal
Liga Portugal 2 players
F.C. Vizela players
FC Tulsa players
USL Championship players
Association football forwards
Ghanaian expatriate sportspeople in Portugal
Expatriate soccer players in the United States
Ghanaian expatriate sportspeople in the United States